Anthony Clifford Grayling  (born 3 April 1949) is a British philosopher and author. He was born in Northern Rhodesia (now Zambia) and spent most of his childhood there and in Nyasaland (now Malawi). In 2011 he founded and became the first Master of New College of the Humanities, an independent undergraduate college in London. Until June 2011, he was Professor of Philosophy at Birkbeck, University of London, where he taught from 1991. He is also a supernumerary fellow of St Anne's College, Oxford, where he formerly taught.

Grayling is the author of about 30 books on philosophy, biography, history of ideas, human rights and ethics, including The Refutation of Scepticism (1985), The Future of Moral Values (1997), Wittgenstein (1992), What Is Good? (2000), The Meaning of Things (2001), The Good Book (2011), The God Argument (2013), The Age of Genius: The Seventeenth Century and the Birth of the Modern Mind (2016) and Democracy and its Crises (2017).

Grayling was a trustee of the London Library and a fellow of the World Economic Forum, and is a fellow of the Royal Society of Literature and the Royal Society of Arts. For a number of years he was a columnist for The Guardian newspaper, and presented the BBC World Service series Exchanges at the Frontier on science and society.

Grayling was a director and contributor at Prospect magazine from its foundation until 2016. He is a vice-president of Humanists UK, honorary associate of the National Secular Society, and Patron of the Defence Humanists. His main academic interests lie in epistemology, metaphysics, and philosophical logic and he has published works in these subjects. His political affiliations lie on the centre-left, and he has defended human rights and politically liberal values in print and by activism. He is associated in Britain with other New Atheists. He frequently appears in British media discussing philosophy and public affairs.

Early life and education
Son of Henry Clifford and Ursula Adelaide Grayling (née Burns), Grayling was born and raised in Luanshya, Northern Rhodesia (now Zambia), within the British expatriate enclave, and raised there and in Nyasaland (now Malawi) where his father worked as manager for the Standard Bank. He attended several boarding schools, including Falcon College in Southern Rhodesia (now Zimbabwe), from which he ran away after being regularly caned. His first exposure to philosophical writing was at the age of twelve, when he found an English translation of the Charmides, one of Plato's dialogues, in a local library. At age fourteen, he read G. H. Lewes's Biographical History of Philosophy (1846), which confirmed his ambition to study philosophy; he said it "superinduced order on the random reading that had preceded it, and settled my vocation".

Grayling had an elder sister Jennifer and brother John. When he was 19 years old, his elder sister Jennifer was murdered in Johannesburg. She had been born with brain damage, and after brain surgery to alleviate it at the age of 20 had experienced personality problems that led to emotional difficulties and a premature marriage. She was found dead in a river shortly after the marriage; she had been stabbed. When her parents went to identify her, her mother—already ill—had a heart attack and died. Grayling said he dealt with his grief by becoming a workaholic.

After moving to England in his teens, he spent three years at the University of Sussex, but said that although he applauded their intention to educate generalists, he wished to be a scholar, so in addition to his BA from Sussex, he also completed one in philosophy as a University of London external student. He went on to obtain an MA from Sussex, then attended Magdalen College, Oxford, where he was taught by P. F. Strawson and A. J. Ayer, obtaining his doctorate in 1981 for a thesis on Epistemological Scepticism and Transcendental Arguments. A part of that thesis is published as The Refutation of Scepticism (1985) and its themes are further developed in Scepticism and the Possibility of Knowledge (2008).

Career
Grayling lectured in philosophy at Bedford College, London, and St Anne's College, Oxford, before taking up a post in 1991 at Birkbeck, University of London, where in 1998 he became reader in philosophy, and in 2005 professor. In addition to his work on Berkeley, philosophical logic, the theory of knowledge, and the history of ideas, the latter including (as chief editor) the four-volume The Continuum Encyclopedia of British Philosophy, he wrote and edited several pedagogical works in philosophy, including An Introduction to Philosophical Logic (3rd ed., 1999) and the two volumes Philosophy: A Guide Through the Subject (1995) and Philosophy: Further Through the Subject (1998).

In his philosophical work, Grayling connected solutions to the problem of scepticism in epistemology with the questions about assertability and the problem of meaning in the philosophy of language and logic. A principal theme in his work is that considerations of metaphysics, which relate to what exists, has to be kept separate from the two connected questions of the relation of thought to its objects in the variety of domains over which thought ranges, and the mastery of discourses about those domains, where a justificationist approach is required.

Grayling resigned from Birkbeck in June 2011 to found and become the first master of New College of the Humanities, an independent undergraduate college in London. In February 2019, Northeastern University, a private research university in Boston, Massachusetts, USA, purchased the New College of the Humanities. He is a Supernumerary Fellow of St Anne's College, Oxford. He was a judge on the Man Booker prize 2003 and Chairman of the Judges for the 2014 Man Booker Prize. He has also been a judge on the Wellcome Trust Book Prize and the Art Fund prize.

In 2013 he was awarded the Forkosch Literary Prize, and in 2015 he received the Bertrand Russell Society Award. Grayling was appointed Commander of the Order of the British Empire (CBE) in the 2017 New Year Honours for services to philosophy.

Public advocacy
For Grayling, work on technical problems is only one aspect of philosophy. Another aspect, one which has been at the centre of philosophy's place in history, has more immediate application to daily life: the questions of ethics, which revolve upon what Grayling calls the great Socratic question, 'How should one live?'. In pursuit of what he describes as 'contributing to the conversation society has with itself about possibilities for good lives in good societies', Grayling writes widely on contemporary issues, including war crimes, the legalisation of drugs, euthanasia, secularism, human rights and other topics in the tradition of Polemics. He has articulated positions on humanist ethics and on the history and nature of concepts of liberty as applied in civic life. In support of his belief that the philosopher should engage in public debate, he brings these philosophical perspectives to issues of the day in his work as a writer and as a commentator on radio and television.

Among his contributions to the discussion about religion in contemporary society he argues that there are three separable, though naturally connected debates:
(a) a metaphysical debate about what the universe contains; denying that it contains supernatural agencies of any kind makes him an atheist;
(b) a debate about the basis of ethics; taking the world to be a natural realm of natural law requires that humanity thinks for itself about the right and the good, based on our best understanding of human nature and the human condition; this makes him a humanist;
(c) a debate about the place of religious movements and organisations in the public domain; as a secularist Grayling argues that these should see themselves as civil society organisations on a par with trade unions and other NGOs, with every right to exist and to have their say, but no greater right than any other self-constituted, self-selected interest group.
On this last point, Grayling's view is that for historical reasons religions have an inflated place in the public domain out of all proportion to the numbers of their adherents or their intrinsic merits, so that their voice and influence is amplified disproportionately: with the result that they can distort such matters as public policy (e.g. on abortion) and science research and education (e.g. stem cells, teaching of evolution). He argues that winning the metaphysical and ethical debates is already abating the problems associated with (c) in more advanced Western societies, even the US. He sees his own major contribution as being the promotion of understanding of humanist ethics deriving from the philosophical tradition.

Between 1999 and 2002 Grayling wrote a weekly column in The Guardian called "The Last Word", on a different topic every week. In these columns, which also formed the basis of a series of books for a general readership, commencing with The Meaning of Things in 2001, Grayling made the basics of philosophy available to the layperson. He is a regular contributor to The Guardian's "Comment is free" group blog, and writes columns for, among others, the Prospect and New Scientist magazines.

Grayling is accredited with the United Nations Human Rights Council, and is a patron of Humanists UK, an Honorary Associate of the National Secular Society, patron of the Defence Humanists, was a Trustee of the London Library, and a board member of the Society of Authors and an Honorary Patron of The Philosophy Foundation, a charity whose aim is to bring philosophy to the wider community, and particularly to disadvantaged schools. In 2003 he was a Booker Prize judge and Chairman of the Judges for the 2014 Man Booker Prize. In 2005, Grayling debated with Christian philosopher William Lane Craig on whether God can exist in an evil world. Grayling is also a Patron of the right to die organisation, My Death My Decision.

Grayling wrote a book on the allied strategic air offensive in World War II, Among the Dead Cities: The History and Moral Legacy of the WWII Bombing of Civilians in Germany and Japan (2006), as a contribution to the debate on the ethics of war. In September 2010, Grayling was one of 55 public figures who sent a letter to The Guardian expressing their opposition to Pope Benedict XVI's state visit to the UK. In August 2014, Grayling was one of 200 public figures who were signatories to a letter to The Guardian opposing Scottish independence in the run-up to September's referendum on that issue.

A. C. Grayling was one of the contributors to the book, We Are One: A Celebration of Tribal Peoples, released in October 2009. The book explores the cultures of peoples around the world, portraying both their diversity and the threats they face. Other contributors included not only western writers, such as Laurens van der Post, Noam Chomsky, Claude Lévi-Strauss, but also indigenous people, such as Davi Kopenawa Yanomami and Roy Sesana. The royalties from the sale of this book go to the indigenous rights organisation, Survival International.

In recent years Grayling has been campaigning against the UK Government's response to the 2016 United Kingdom European Union membership referendum result. In his book, Democracy and Its Crisis, Grayling argues that voting systems must be reformed to prevent certain results, such as Brexit and the election of Donald Trump. Grayling has tweeted that Brexit must be made to disappear like a "nasty, temporary, hiccup, soon forgotten".

Personal life
Grayling lives in central London. He has two children from his first marriage, Anthony Joslin Clifford Grayling and Georgina Eveline Ursula Grayling, and one daughter, Madeline Catherine Jennifer Grayling, from his second marriage to novelist Katie Hickman.

Positions held
Fellow of the Royal Society of Literature
 Fellow of the Royal Society of Arts
 Fellow of the World Economic Forum (2000–2004)
 Member of the editorial boards of Reason in Practice and Prospect
 British Academy visitor to the Institute of Philosophy at the Chinese Academy of Social Sciences (1986)
 Director of the Sino-British Summer School in Philosophy in Beijing (1988, 1993)
 Jan Hus Visiting Fellow at the Institute of Philosophy at the Academy of Sciences of the Czech Republic (1994 and 1996)
 Leverhulme Trust Research Fellowship (1998)
 Honorary Secretary of the Aristotelian Society (1993–2001)
 Gifford Lecturer at the University of Glasgow (2005)
 Past chairman of June Fourth, a human rights group concerned with China
 Honorary Associate of the National Secular Society
 Patron of the British Armed Forces Humanist Association UK Armed Forces Humanist Association (UKAFHA)
 Representative to the UN Human Rights Council for the International Humanist and Ethical Union
 Vice-president, British Humanist Association.  In June 2011, it was announced that he had decided not to take up the position of President of the BHA.
 Member of the C1 World Dialogue group on relations between Islam and the West

Publications

 An Introduction to Philosophical Logic (1982). 
 The Refutation of Scepticism (1985). 
 Berkeley: The Central Arguments (1986). 
 Wittgenstein (1988). 
 with Susan Whitfield. China: A Literary Companion (1994). 
 (ed). Philosophy: A Guide Through the Subject (1995). 
 Russell (1996). 
 Republished in 2002 as Russell: A Very Short Introduction.  
 The Future of Moral Values (1997), 
 Philosophy 2: Further Through the Subject (1998). , ed.
 The Quarrel of the Age: The Life and Times of William Hazlitt (2000). 
 The Meaning of Things: Applying Philosophy to Life (2001). 
 published in the US as Meditations for the Humanist: Ethics for a Secular Age.
 The Reason of Things: Living with Philosophy (2002). 
 published in the US as Life, Sex, and Ideas: The Good Life Without God.
 What Is Good?: The Search for the Best Way to Live (2003). 
 The Mystery of Things (2004). 
 The Art of Always Being Right (2004).  [Edited T. Bailey Saunders' translation of Schopenhauer's essay The Art of Being Right]
 Descartes: The Life of René Descartes and Its Place in His Times (2005). 
 The Heart of Things: Applying Philosophy to the 21st Century (2005). 
 The Form of Things: Essays on Life, Ideas and Liberty in the 21st Century (2006). 
 with Andrew Pyle and Naomi Goulder (eds). The Continuum Encyclopedia of British Philosophy (2006), 
 Among the Dead Cities: The History and Moral Legacy of the WWII Bombing of Civilians in Germany and Japan (2006). 
 with Mick Gordon. On Religion (2007).
 Against All Gods: Six Polemics on Religion and an Essay on Kindness (2007). 
 Truth, Meaning and Realism: Essays in the Philosophy of Thought (2007). 
 Towards The Light (2007). 
 published in the US as Towards the Light of Liberty.
 The Choice of Hercules (2007).
 Scepticism and the Possibility of Knowledge (2008).
 Ideas That Matter: A Personal Guide for the 21st Century (2009). 
 Liberty in the Age of Terror : A Defence of Civil Society and Enlightenment Values (2009).
 To Set Prometheus Free: Essays on Religion, Reason and Humanity (2009). 
 Thinking of Answers: Questions in the Philosophy of Everyday Life (2010). 
The Good Book (2011). 
Friendship (2013). 
The God Argument (2013). 
 Among the Dead Cities: Was the Allied Bombing of Civilians in WWII a Necessity or a Crime? (Bloomsbury edition; 2014). 
The Challenge of Things: Thinking Through Troubled Times (2015). 
The Age of Genius: The Seventeenth Century and the Birth of the Modern Mind (2016). 
War: An Enquiry (2017). 
Democracy and its Crisis (2018). 
The History of Philosophy (2019). 
The Good State: On the Principles of Democracy (2020). 
The Frontiers of Knowledge: What We Know About Science, History and The Mind (2021). 
For the Good of the World: Is Global Agreement on Global Challenges Possible? (2022).

Foreword to other books 
Foreword to Shyam Wuppuluri, N. C. A. da Costa (eds.), "Wittgensteinian (adj.): Looking at the World from the Viewpoint of Wittgenstein's Philosophy" Springer — The Frontiers Collection, 2019.

References

External links

Further reading

 
 A. C. Grayling website
 Blog in The Guardian
 Schwarz, Benjamin.  "Fire From the Sky: What not to read this month", Atlantic Monthly, 30 May 2006.  review of Grayling's Among the Dead Cities.
 Smoler, Fredric. "Was the American Bombing Campaign in World War II a War Crime?", American Heritage, 6 April 2006; review of Among the Dead Cities.
 "Five Minutes with AC Grayling", BBC..
 "Interview with Grayling", The Science Network.
 "Interview with Grayling", ABC Radio National, 20 February 2008.
 TDF Interview about Grace as co-dramatist
 "Mindfields by A. C. Grayling", New Scientist.
 Intelligence Squared Debate – Atheism is the new fundamentalism
 "Grayling in conversation", BBC World Service (audio).
 "Grayling speaking on human flourishing", The Science Network (video)

1949 births
20th-century atheists
20th-century British non-fiction writers
20th-century English philosophers
21st-century atheists
21st-century British non-fiction writers
21st-century English philosophers
21st-century English writers
Academics of Birkbeck, University of London
Alumni of Falcon College
Alumni of Magdalen College, Oxford
Alumni of the University of London
Alumni of the University of Sussex
Alumni of University of London Worldwide
Analytic philosophers
Atheism in the United Kingdom
Atheist philosophers
British atheism activists
British critics of Islam
British ethicists
British secularists
British social commentators
Commanders of the Order of the British Empire
Critical theorists
Critics of Christianity
Critics of creationism
Critics of Islamism
Critics of new religious movements
Critics of postmodernism
Critics of religions
Critics of the Catholic Church
English atheists
English humanists
English logicians
English male non-fiction writers
Environmental philosophers
Epistemologists
Fellows of St Anne's College, Oxford
Fellows of the Royal Society of Literature
Founders of English schools and colleges
Living people
Logicians
Metaphysicians
New College of the Humanities
Ontologists
People from Luanshya
Philosophers of culture
Philosophers of education
Philosophers of literature
Philosophers of logic
Philosophers of love
Philosophers of mind
Philosophers of religion
Philosophers of science
Philosophers of sexuality
Philosophers of social science
Philosophers of technology
Philosophers of war
Philosophical logic
Philosophy academics
Philosophy writers
Political philosophers
Secular humanists
Social philosophers
Theorists on Western civilization
Writers about activism and social change
Writers about globalization
Writers about religion and science
Zambian atheists
Zambian humanists
Zambian people of British descent
Zambian people of English descent
Zambian philosophers